The Pakistani cricket team toured Ireland from 23 May to 26 May 2013. The tour consisted of two One Day Internationals (ODIs). The matches were broadcast on YouTube.

Squads

ODI series

1st ODI

2nd ODI

References

External links
 Series home at ESPN Cricinfo

2013
2013 in Pakistani cricket
International cricket competitions in 2013
2013 in Irish cricket